Edward Wienholt (1833–1904) was a politician in Queensland, Australia. He was a Member of the Queensland Legislative Assembly.

Politics
Wienholt was elected to the Queensland Legislative Assembly in Western Downs at the 1868 colonial election on 14 September. The Western Downs seat was abolished at the 1873 election, and Weinholt contested and won Darling Downs on 4 November 1873. Wienhold was an adherent of Sir Arthur Palmer, who served as Premier of Queensland from 1870 to 1874. Wienhold supported free trade and the rights of landholders, and the restriction of free education. He held the seat until he resigned on 1 February 1875 as he intended to travel to Europe.

Personal life
Edward Wienholt was born in Laugharne, Carmarthenshire, Wales on 28 March 1833, the son of John Birkett Wienholt (1775–1852), a merchant, and his second wife Sarah, . His brothers Daniel (1822–1865), Arnold (1826-1895) and Arthur (1835–1892), were also prominent pioneers in Queensland. Edward Wienholt arrived in Queensland in 1853.

Edward Wienholt married Ellen Williams (1856–1898) in 1874. They had 3 sons and 3 daughters. Their son Arnold who also went into politics.

He established the Wienholt Pastoral Estates company in 1889.

Wienholt retired in 1880 and settled in Ross on Wye in Herefordshire, England. He travelled to Australia frequently in his retirement and he died in Melbourne on 14 January 1904.

See also
 Members of the Queensland Legislative Assembly, 1873–1878
 Fassifern Homestead

References

Members of the Queensland Legislative Assembly
People from Laugharne
1904 deaths
1833 births
19th-century Australian politicians
Welsh emigrants to Australia